Burden of Truth is a Canadian legal drama television series, starring Kristin Kreuk, which premiered on CBC on January 10, 2018. The series was created by Brad Simpson, and is executive-produced by Kreuk, Ilana Frank and Jocelyn Hamilton. In the US, the series is part of The CW's summer programming slate. One of the issues addressed in the series is institutional racism towards indigenous people.

Plot 

Corporate attorney Joanna Hanley returns to her small hometown of Millwood, Manitoba in order to represent a large pharmaceutical company against a group of sick girls, but starts to see that these girls need her help.

Cast and characters

Main 
 Kristin Kreuk as Joanna Chang (formerly Hanley, in season 1), an attorney from Toronto who has come back to the town she grew up in to defend a pharmaceutical company against a group of sick girls. However, she stays both to uncover the bigger conspiracy hiding the true cause of the girls' sickness and to find out the truth about why she and her father left Millwood in the first place. She changes her surname to her mother's maiden name by the final scene of the first season as a result of a better understanding with each other, and her estranged relationship with her father.
 Peter Mooney as Billy Crawford, the lawyer representing the girls and later Joanna's partner in uncovering the conspiracy. He is the uncle of Molly Ross, one of the first girls to get sick. It is revealed in Season 2 that he has strained relationships with his father and his brother Shane. By the start of Season 3, he and Joanna become partners with the newly formed Crawford Chang and domestically.
 Star Slade as Luna Spence, Joanna's assistant and younger half sister as well as Molly Ross's girlfriend
 Nicola Correia-Damude as Diane Evans, a Guyanese-Canadian school guidance counselor and an old friend of Joanna's
 Meegwun Fairbrother as Owen Beckbie, an indigenous cop and Luna's ex-stepfather. By the start of Season 3, he was promoted to Millwood's Chief of Police.
 Paul Braunstein as Sam Mercer, Millwood's Chief of Police corrupted by his own racism towards indigenous residents which puts him at odds with Owen. By the end of Season 2, he is stripped of his duties, dismissed from the force and sent to prison for the death of an indigenous man. Released from prison at the start of Season 3, he engages in blackmail which was discovered by Taylor and Owen.
 Sara Thompson as Molly Ross (Seasons 1-2), one of the sick girls, Billy Crawford's niece and Luna's girlfriend
 Anwen O'Driscoll as Taylor Matheson, one of the sick girls and Ben Matheson's daughter
 David Lawrence Brown as Ben Matheson (Seasons 1–2), father of Taylor Matheson, one of the sick girls and the owner of the town's mill.
 Michelle Nolden as Teddie Lavery (Season 2), Joanna's mentor and boss at Steadman Lavery
 Varun Saranga as Noah Achari (Season 2), Joanna's new client
 Sera-Lys McArthur as Kodie Chartrand (Season 3), Joanna's indigenous childhood best friend who is threatened with separation from her two daughters
 Dayle McLeod as Katherine “Kat” Carmichael (Season 3), a recent law school graduate who was the only one of Crawford Chang's two original Associates to be retained. So impressed by Joanna that she gave up more lucrative opportunities to work with her, she later developed a close relationship with colleague Luna.

Recurring 
 Cassandra Potenza as Georgia Lewis
 Benjamin Ayres as Alan Christie (season 1, 3), an attorney working for Joanna's father's law firm and, whom Joanna was dating at the start of the series.
 Jessica Matten as Gerrilyn Spence, Luna's mother
 Rebecca Gibson as Wendy Ross, Billy's sister and Molly's mother
 Jerni Stewart as Lisa Mitchell
 Montana Lehmann as Allie Nash
 Alex Carter as David Hanley (Seasons 1–2), Joanna's father and a partner at the law firm she worked for at the start of the series. Estranged from Joanna and revealed to be Luna's biological father, his murder was one of the primary storylines in Season 2.
 Andrew Chown as Shane Crawford (season 2), Billy's brother
 Raymond Ablack as Sunil Doshi (season 2), a young lawyer at Steadman Lavery

Episodes

Season 1 (2018)

Season 2 (2019)

Season 3 (2020)

Season 4 (2021)

Production 
Noelle Carbone and Adriana Maggs were the original showrunners but left the series. Ten one-hour episodes were ordered. It was filmed in Winnipeg, Manitoba in summer 2017. The series' original setting was supposed to have been in Eastern Canada but was changed to Manitoba because of lower production costs. Location shots were filmed in Selkirk and Sanford, with several shots in the Riverside Grill.  In outdoor shots, traffic on the Selkirk bridge is visible, as is the Landmark Cinemas Garry Selkirk theater.

The series was renewed for an eight-episode second season on April 4, 2018.

The series was renewed for an eight-episode third season on March 25, 2019 and returned on January 8, 2020.

On July 21, 2020, the series was renewed for an eight-episode fourth season.

On March 18, 2021, it was announced that the series would end after four seasons.

Broadcast 
In April 2018, The CW network acquired the series for a planned run in the United States in mid-2018. The series debuted on the network on July 25, 2018. The network aired seasons 2 and 3 in the summers of 2019 and 2020. Season 4 returned to the CBC on January 28, 2021. The final season aired in the United States on The CW on July 30, 2021 and the series concluded on September 17, 2021. In January 2022, the series became available on Hulu in the US.

References

External links 
 

CBC Television original programming
2018 Canadian television series debuts
2021 Canadian television series endings
Canadian legal television series
2010s Canadian drama television series
2020s Canadian drama television series
Television shows set in Manitoba
Television shows filmed in Manitoba
Television series by Entertainment One
English-language television shows